The Office of the British Columbia Ombudsperson is one of ten provincial ombudsman offices in Canada. It receives enquiries and complaints about the administrative practices and services of public agencies in British Columbia. It is headed by the B.C. Ombudsperson, an officer of the provincial legislature who is independent of government and political parties.  Its role is to impartially investigate complaints to determine whether public agencies have acted fairly and reasonably, and whether their actions and decisions were consistent with relevant legislation, policies and procedures.

History 
Following the ombudsperson model which originated in Sweden in 1809, the Office of the Ombudsperson, British Columbia, was established in 1970.

The first ombudsperson in British Columbia was Karl Friedmann (1979–1985). He was succeeded by Peter Bazowski (Acting Ombudsman 1985–1986), Stephen Owen (1986–1992), Dulcie McCallum (1992–1999), Brent Parfitt (Acting Ombudsman 1999 and 2006), Howard Kushner (1999–2006), Kim Carter (2006–2015) and Jay Chalke (2015 to present).

As ombudsperson, Carter introduced an early resolution program to improve the timeliness of resolutions for individuals and authorities. She has also established a systemic investigation team that has produced a number of public reports on areas ranging from lottery prize security to home and community care programs for seniors.

In the years 2012 and 2013, about 7,500 inquiries and complaints were responded to and 1,900  resolutions or investigations were completed. Nearly 20 per cent of the complaints involved the Social Development Ministry

In 2014, the office investigated the oversight and regulation of private post-secondary institutions in the province.

Role and mandate 
The ombudsman operates under the authority of the BC Ombudsperson Act, and can investigate complaints of unfair treatment by more than 2,000 public agencies in British Columbia in the process of implementing government policies. Before registering a complaint, people who contact the Ombudsperson's Office are first referred to specific agencies' internal resolution procedures, if they haven't already tried this route.

The office responds to complaints from individuals and organizations, and also initiates systemic investigations. Confidential  interpretation services are offered in more than 180 languages and written information about the Ombudsperson's Office is available in English, French, Chinese, Filipino, Korean, Punjabi, Vietnamese and Spanish.

The office also makes recommendations about improvement in administrative processes, so that the same problems do not recur.  For example, In September 2013,  the office produced a 'preventative ombudsmanship' report, Open Meetings: Best Practices Guide for Local Governments. In February 2013, the office produced a report that made recommendations for improvement to practices followed by the Public Guardian and Trustee and the six health authorities, establishing provincial training for staff, and creating legally binding minimum requirements when creating certificates of incapability. In 2014, the office released recommendations for improvement in environmental oversight by the Ministry of Forests, Lands and Natural Resources of land development.

The office brings issues to public awareness, and also reports directly to the British Columbia Legislature. An ombudsperson's recommendations are usually very specific suggestions for legislative, regulatory or procedural changes. In 2012 the office issued its largest report called The Best of Care: Getting it Right for Seniors in British Columbia, Part 2, making recommendations to the Ministry of Health and five health authorities about improving home and community care, home support, assisted living and residential care services for seniors.

Agencies that are under the ombudsperson jurisdiction include all provincial ministries, Crown corporations, boards and commissions (e.g. WorkSafeBC).  Municipalities, regional districts, schools and boards of education, as well as health authorities and hospitals, and also self-regulating professions, such as the College of Physicians and Surgeons, the Law Society, College of Social Workers, are all included.

Current officeholder 
Jay Chalke was appointed Ombudsperson in May, 2015. His six-year term as Ombudsperson started July 1, 2015.

From 2011 to 2015 Jay led the Justice Services Branch of the Ministry of Justice.

Prior to his appointment with the Ministry of Justice, Jay was the first Public Guardian and Trustee of British Columbia from 2000 to 2011. He was also a member of Canada's delegation to the Hague Conference on Private International Law.

Earlier in his career, Jay held a variety of public sector positions, including Deputy Public Trustee of British Columbia, Deputy Public Guardian and Trustee of Ontario, Head of the Review of Certain Practices in New Brunswick Correctional Institutions, Senior Policy Advisor for justice policy in the government of Ontario's Cabinet Office, and Crown Counsel with the Ontario Ministry of the Attorney General. He began his career as a Correctional and Psychiatric Services Investigator with the Ombudsman of Ontario.

Jay has served as a member of the Justice and Public Safety Council of British Columbia, and a Governor of the Law Foundation of British Columbia. He is a member of the Law Society of British Columbia, and was appointed Queen's Counsel in 2006.

Countless public Google reviews have raised concern that the BC Ombudsman was created by legislators to insulate government cronies. Legislators have also given special powers to the BC Ombudsman to dodge transparency & Freedom of Information access laws.

Reports and publications 
The Office of the Ombudsman has created both annual and investigation-specific reports, which are publicly available on its website.

References

External links 
 
 Reports and other publications of the BC Ombudsperson

Government of British Columbia
British Columbia
Canada, British Columbia